Liotia romalea is a species of sea snail, a marine gastropod mollusk in the family Liotiidae.

Description
The height of the shell reaches 5 mm and its diameter 5 mm. 
The small, solid shell has an ovate-round shape with 5 whorls. It is narrowly umbilicate. The two apical whorls are smooth, the antepenultimate has one keel, the penultimate two and the body whorl three keels. The shell contains longitudinally close, thick ribs. The interstices show longitudinal striae. The aperture is circular and white on the inside. The conspicuously thickened peristome is five-angled.

Distribution
This species occurs in the Gulf of Oman and the Persian Gulf.

References

 Melvill, J.C., 1906. A revision of the species of Cyclostrematidae and Liotiidae occurring in the Persian Gulf and North Arabian Sea. Proceedings of the Malacological Society of London 7:20-283, 20-28, plate 3.

External links
 To World Register of Marine Species

romalea
Gastropods described in 1903